Charlie Hickey (born September 24, 1964) is an American college baseball coach.  He has been the head coach of Central Connecticut since the 2000 season, leading the Blue Devils to six NCAA Tournaments.  Previously, he was the head coach at Providence for three seasons (1997–1999).  Providence announced it was cutting the program prior to the 1999 season, but the team won that year's Big East title and advanced to an NCAA Regional final.

Coaching career

Collegiate summer baseball
Before becoming an NCAA head coach, Hickey was an assistant with the Cotuit Kettleers of the Cape Cod Baseball League from 1992 to 1994, and head coach of the New England Collegiate Baseball League's Eastern Tides in 1996.

Providence
Hickey began his coaching career as an assistant at Providence in the 1992 season.  He held the position for five years, then became head coach when Paul Kostacopoulos left to become the head coach at Maine following the 1996 season.

Hickey coached Providence for three seasons (1997–1999).  In 1997, the Friars missed the Big East Tournament.  In 1998, the team won 31 games and earned a Big East Tournament berth.  There, it lost its opening game to St. John's, then defeated Rutgers and West Virginia before being eliminated by Notre Dame.

In October 1998, Providence announced it would cut its baseball program following the 1999 season, due to Title IX's gender equity requirements.  During that season, Providence finished third in the Big East and went 49–16 to set a New England record for wins.  It also swept the conference's major awards, with Hickey named Coach of the Year.  At the Big East Tournament, the Friars started off 1–1, defeating fourth-seeded Seton Hall in the opening game, then losing to second-seeded Rutgers.  It then won three consecutive games (over Notre Dame, Rutgers, and St. John's) to win the tournament and receive the Big East's automatic bid to the NCAA Tournament.  As a two-seed at the Tallahassee Regional, the Friars lost their opener to Jacksonville, 7–5.  They staved off elimination with a 12–1 win over The Citadel.  In the 1–1 game (a rematch against Jacksonville), Providence fell behind 7–1, but rallied to win 9–8 in a game that saw a bench-clearing brawl and support from Florida State's fans.  In the regional championship, Florida State defeated the Friars, 14–3, in the program's final game.  The team's season was the subject of a book by Paul Lonardo and received national attention in the debate over Title IX.

Central Connecticut
Hickey was offered the head coaching position at Central Connecticut (which he accepted) by retiring CCSU coach George Redman.  Under Hickey, CCSU had a great deal of success in the early 2000s.  The Blue Devils qualified for the NCAA Tournament in 2002, 2003, and 2004, also winning NEC regular season titles in 2001 and 2006.  Hickey was named NEC Coach of the Year in 2001, 2003, and 2006.  Since 2006, CCSU has not won an NEC regular season title, but the Blue Devils won the NEC Tournament in 2010 to reach their fourth NCAA Tournament under Hickey.

In 2012, Hickey surpassed Hank Majlinger to become Central Connecticut's winningest coach. In 2013, he won his 500th career game. In 2014, multiple Blue Devils were selected in the Major League Baseball Draft for the first time in his tenure at CCSU– pitcher Nick Neumann was taken by the Pirates, and outfielder J.P. Sportman was taken by the Athletics.

Head coaching record
Below is a table of Hickey's yearly records as a collegiate head baseball coach.

See also
List of current NCAA Division I baseball coaches
Central Connecticut Blue Devils

References

External links
 CCSU Blue Devils bio

1964 births
Living people
Sportspeople from Middletown, Connecticut
Cape Cod Baseball League coaches
Central Connecticut Blue Devils baseball coaches
Providence Friars baseball coaches
University of Connecticut alumni